Àlex Corretja and Juan Carlos Ferrero were the defending champions, but Corretja chose not to participate this year. Ferrero played alongside Andriy Medvedev, but lost to Sébastien Grosjean and Michaël Llodra in the final, 6−7(4−7), 5−7.

Draw

Final

Group A
Standings are determined by: 1. number of wins; 2. number of matches; 3. in three-players-ties, percentage of sets won, or of games won; 4. steering-committee decision.

Group B
Standings are determined by: 1. number of wins; 2. number of matches; 3. in three-players-ties, percentage of sets won, or of games won; 4. steering-committee decision.

References
Main Draw

Legends Under 45 Doubles